Nawaf Al Humaidan (born 8 March 1981) is a Kuwaiti footballer who is a midfielder for the Kuwaiti Premier League club Kazma.

References

External links
 

1981 births
Living people
Kuwaiti footballers
Kuwait international footballers
Olympic footballers of Kuwait
Footballers at the 2000 Summer Olympics
Sportspeople from Kuwait City
Association football midfielders
2004 AFC Asian Cup players
Kazma SC players
Kuwait Premier League players